Nocardioides salarius is a bacterium from the genus Nocardioides which has been isolated from zooplankton from the South Sea near Korea.

References

Further reading

External links
Type strain of Nocardioides salarius at BacDive -  the Bacterial Diversity Metadatabase	

salarius
Bacteria described in 2008